The 1950 United States Senate elections occurred in the middle of Harry S. Truman's second term as president. The 32 seats of Class 3 were contested in regular elections, and four special elections were held to fill vacancies. As with most 20th-century second-term midterms, the party not holding the presidency made significant gains. The Republican opposition made a net gain of five seats, taking advantage of the Democratic administration's declining popularity during the Cold War and the aftermath of the Recession of 1949. The Democrats held a narrow 49-to-47-seat majority after the election. This was the first time since 1932 that the Senate majority leader lost his seat, and the only instance of the majority leader losing his seat while his party retained the majority.

Results summary 

Colored shading indicates party with largest share of that row.

Source: Clerk of the U.S. House of Representatives

Gains, losses, and holds

Retirements
One Republican and three Democrats retired instead of seeking re-election.

Defeats
Two Republicans and eight Democrats sought re-election but lost in the primary or general election.

Change in composition

Before the elections

Results of the elections

Race summaries

Special elections during the 81st Congress 
In these special elections, the winners were seated during 1950 or before January 3, 1951; ordered by election date.

Races leading to the 82nd Congress 
In these regular elections, the winner was seated on January 3, 1951; ordered by state.

All of the elections involved the Class 3 seats.

Closest races 
Fifteen races had a margin of victory under 10%:

Alabama

Arizona 

Incumbent Democratic U.S. senator Carl Hayden ran for re-election to a fifth term, defeating Republican nominee Bruce Brockett in the general election. Brockett was formerly the Republican nominee for governor in both 1946 and 1948.  Hayden first defeated Cecil H. Miller and Robert E. Miller (of the Arizona Farm Bureau), for the Democratic nomination.

Arkansas

California

Colorado

Connecticut

Connecticut (special)

Connecticut (regular)

Florida 

Democratic incumbent Senator Claude Pepper lost renomination May 2, 1950 to George A. Smathers, who easily won the general election.

The Democratic primary for the 1950 United States Senate election in Florida was described as the "most bitter and ugly campaigns in Florida political history." Ormund Powers, a Central Florida historian, noted that ABC and NBC commentator David Brinkley said that "the Peppers-Smathers campaign would always stand out in his mind as the dirtiest in the history of American politics". On January 12, 1950, U.S. Representative George A. Smathers declared his candidacy for the race in Orlando at Kemp's Coliseum, where about 3,000 supporters had gathered. In his opening speech, Smathers accused Pepper of being "the leader of the radicals and extremists", an advocate of treason, and a person against the constitutional rights of Americans. Ed Ball, a power in state politics who had broken with Claude Pepper, financed his opponent, Smathers.

Prior to the entry of Smathers and Pepper, Orlando attorney James G. Horrell campaigned for the seat. Horrell researched Pepper's weaknesses and the state's voters. Horrell also compiled a list of communist-front groups that Pepper had communicated with. On the day that Pepper declared his candidacy, Horrell withdrew and endorsed Smathers. Horrell also sent his reports about Pepper to Smathers, which he used throughout the next few months. This would also prevent the chance of a run-off election. In late February and early March, the Jacksonville Journal conducted a poll in 11 counties important for the election. Smathers led by about 2-to-1 and dominated in Duval, Pinellas, and Volusia counties, while he was also statistically tied with Pepper in Dade, Escambia, and Hillsborough counties. However, Smathers did not trail in any of the 11 counties.

Smathers repeatedly attacked "Red Pepper" for having communist sympathies, condemning both his support for universal health care and his alleged support for the Soviet Union. Pepper had traveled to the Soviet Union in 1945 and, after meeting Soviet leader Joseph Stalin, declared he was "a man Americans could trust." Additionally, although Pepper supported universal health care, sometimes referred to as "socialized medicine", Smathers voted for "socialized medicine" in the senate when it was introduced as Medicare in 1965. In The Saturday Evening Post, even respected writer and notorious anti-segregation editor Ralph McGill labeled Pepper a "spell-binding pinko". Beginning on March 28 and until the day of the primary, Smathers named one communist organization each day that Pepper addressed, starting with the American Slav Congress.

Pepper's opponents circulated widely a 49-page booklet titled The Red Record of Senator Claude Pepper. It contained photographs and headlines from several communist publications such as the Daily Worker. In April the Daily Worker endorsed Pepper, with Communist Party of Florida leader George Nelson warning that a Smathers victory would "strengthen the Dixiecrat-KKK forces in Florida as well as throughout the South." The booklet also made it seem as if Pepper desired to give Russia nuclear bomb-making instructions, billions of dollars, and the United States' natural resources. There was also a double page montage of Pepper in 1946 at New York City's Madison Square Garden with progressive Henry A. Wallace and civil rights activist Paul Robeson, and quoted Pepper speaking favorably of both of them. Throughout the campaign, Pepper denied sympathizing with communism.

Simultaneous to this election, then-U.S. House Representative Richard Nixon was running for the senate seat in California. In a letter from Senator Karl E. Mundt of South Dakota, he told Nixon that "It occurs to me that if Helen is your opponent in the fall, something of a similar nature might well be produced", in reference to The Red Record of Senator Claude Pepper and a similar Democratic primary between Manchester Boddy and Helen Gahagan Douglas.

Race also played a role in the election. Labor unions began a voter registration drive, which mostly added African Americans to the voter rolls. Smathers accused the "Northern labor bosses" of paying black people to register and vote for Pepper. Shortly after Smathers declared his candidacy, he indicated to the Florida Peace Officers Association that he would defend law enforcement officers for free if they were found guilty of civil rights violations. With the election occurring during the era of racial segregation, Pepper was portrayed as favoring integration and interracial marriage. He was also labeled a "nigger lover" and accused by Orlando Sentinel publisher Martin Andersen of shaking hands with a black woman in Sanford. In Dade County, which had a significant black and Jewish population, doctored photographs depicting Smathers in a Ku Klux Klan hood were distributed.

In the Groveland Case, four young African American men – Charles Greenlee, Walter Irvin, Samuel Shepherd, and Ernest Thomas – known as the Groveland Four, were accused of raping a 17-year old white women in Groveland on July 16, 1949. Thomas fled the area but was later shot and killed by police. Greenlee, Irvin, and Shepherd were convicted by an all-white jury. After the St. Petersburg Times questioned the verdict in April 1950, Lake County State Attorney J. W. Hunter, a supporter of Pepper, demanded that Pepper repudiate the news articles. However, Pepper refused. Hunter then denounced Pepper and endorsed Smathers. In addition to the racial violence, cross burning was also common at the time, with five in Jacksonville, ten in Orlando and Winter Park, and seventeen in the Tallahassee area.

With the accusation of "Northern labor bosses" sending "the carpetbaggers of 1950" to Florida on his behalf, Pepper reminded voters that Smathers was born in New Jersey and sometimes referred to him as a "damn Yankee intruder". In response, Smathers decorated speaking platform in the colors of his alma mater at the University of Florida, orange and blue, while informing his supporters that Pepper graduated from Harvard Law School.

Powers noted that throughout the campaign, "scarcely a day passed" without Andersen writing a news story, column, or editorial that was very positive of Smathers or highly critical of Pepper. Thirty-eight daily newspapers in Florida endorsed Smathers, while only the St. Petersburg Times and The Daytona Beach News-Journal endorsed Pepper. Among the newspapers that supported Smathers were the Miami Herald, owned by John S. Knight, and the Miami Daily News, published by James M. Cox, a former Governor of Ohio and the Democratic Party nominee for the 1920 presidential election. However, Pepper's aides compared this situation to when Alf Landon was endorsed by more editors and newspapers than Franklin Roosevelt in 1936, but received far fewer votes than him.

Smathers performed generally well across many areas of the state, with the exception of Miami, Tampa, and the Florida Panhandle. On the morning after the election, Andersen wrote on the front-page headline of the Orlando Sentinel, "Praise God From Whom All Blessings Flow ... We Have Won from Hell to Breakfast And From Dan to Beersheba ... And Staved Off Socialism", which was inspired by a  headline in The New York Times celebrating Lawerence of Arabia's victory over the Turks in 1917.

Smathers defeated Booth in a landslide in the general election on November 7. Results indicated that Smathers received 76.3% of the vote compared to just 23.7% for Booth. In the popular vote, Smathers garnered 238,987 votes versus 74,228 for Booth. Smathers fared well throughout the state and won all but Pinellas County.

Georgia 

Five-term Democratic Senator Walter F. George was re-elected without opposition.

George would retire after this term.

Idaho 

There were two elections on the same day due to the October 8, 1949 death of one-term Democrat Bert H. Miller.

Idaho (special) 

Republican former-senator Henry Dworshak — who had lost re-election to Miller in 1948 — was appointed to continue the term pending a special election to the class 2 seat, which he then won.

Idaho (regular) 

One-term Democrat Glen H. Taylor lost renomination to the class 3 seat to his predecessor D. Worth Clark. Taylor had beaten Clark for the Democratic nomination in 1944, and this year Clark did the same to him.  However in the general election, Clark was easily beaten by Republican State senator Herman Welker.

Illinois

Indiana 

First-term Republican Homer E. Capehart was re-elected.

Capehart would win re-election again in 1956, but lose his seat in 1962.

Iowa 

One-term Republican Bourke B. Hickenlooper was re-elected.

Hickenlooper would continue serving in the Senate until his retirement in 1969.

Kansas 

There were 2 elections to the same seat on the same day due to the November 8, 1949 death of two-term Republican Clyde M. Reed.  Governor of Kansas Frank Carlson appointed fellow-Republican Harry Darby December 2, 1949 to continue the term, pending a special election.  Carlson won both elections and was seated November 29, 1950.

Kansas (special)

Kansas (regular)

Kentucky 

There were 2 elections to the same seat on the same day, due to the January 19, 1949 resignation of Democrat Alben W. Barkley to become U.S. Vice President. Governor of Kentucky Earle Clements appointed fellow-Democrat Garrett L. Withers to continue the term, pending a special election. The winner of the special election would complete the current term, from November until the start of the next Congress on January 3, while the regular election was for the full term from 1951-1957. Clements, himself, won both elections and was sworn in November 27, 1950. Withers later served one term in the U.S. House of Representatives.

Kentucky (special)

Kentucky (regular)

Louisiana

Maryland

Missouri

Nevada

New Hampshire

New York 

The Socialist Workers state convention met on July 9, and nominated Joseph Hansen for the U.S. Senate.

The American Labor state convention met on September 6 and nominated W.E.B. DuBois for the U.S. Senate.

The Republican state convention met on September 7 at Saratoga Springs, New York. They re-nominated Lieutenant Governor Joe R. Hanley for the U.S. Senate.

The Democratic state convention met on September 7 at Rochester, New York, and re-nominated the incumbent U.S. senator Herbert H. Lehman

The Liberal state convention met on September 6 and 7 at the Statler Hotel in New York City, and endorsed Democratic nominee Lehman.

Nearly the whole Republican statewide ticket was elected in a landslide; with only the Democratic incumbent U.S. senator, Ex-Governor Herbert H. Lehman, managing to stay in office.

North Carolina 

There were 2 elections in North Carolina.

North Carolina (special)

North Carolina (regular)

North Dakota

Ohio

Oklahoma

Oregon

Pennsylvania

Rhode Island (special)

South Carolina

South Dakota

Utah

Vermont

Washington

Wisconsin

See also 
 1950 United States elections
 1950 United States House of Representatives elections
 81st United States Congress
 82nd United States Congress

Notes

References 

 
 New York Red Book 1951